Magomedkhan Magomedovich Magomedov (born 27 January 1998) is a Russian-Azerbaijani freestyle wrestler who currently competes at 97 kilograms and represents Dagestan in the national circuit. Magomedov won one of the bronze medals at the 2022 World Wrestling Championships in Belgrade. The 2018 Junior World Champion, Magomedov was the Golden Grand Prix Ivan Yarygin winner in 2021 and the silver medalist in 2020.

Achievements

References

External links 
 

Living people
1998 births
Place of birth missing (living people)
Russian male sport wrestlers
European Wrestling Champions
World Wrestling Championships medalists
Sportspeople from Dagestan
21st-century Russian people
21st-century Azerbaijani people